4-Diphosphocytidyl-2-C-methyl-D-erythritol 2-phosphate (or CDP-MEP, 4-diphosphocytidyl-2C methylerythritol 2-phosphate) is an intermediate in the MEP pathway of isoprenoid precursor biosynthesis.

It is formed by CDP-ME kinase (IspE) and is a substrate for 2C-methyl-D-erythritol 2,4-cyclodiphosphate synthase (IspF).

References

Organophosphates